The 2022 Spielberg FIA Formula 2 round was a motor racing event held between 8 and 10 July 2022 at the Red Bull Ring, Spielberg, Austria. It was the eighth round of the 2022 FIA Formula 2 Championship and was held in support of the 2022 Austrian Grand Prix.

Driver changes 
Prior to the eighth round in Spielberg, Campos Racing announced on 6 July that Roberto Merhi would make his Formula 2 comeback by replacing Swiss driver Ralph Boschung due to the effects of a neck injury sustained at the third round in Imola. At the age of 31 years, Merhi became the oldest driver to compete in a Formula 2 round.

In addition, Van Amersfoort Racing driver Amaury Cordeel made his comeback after his ban in the previous round in Silverstone following the collection of 12 penalty points.

Classification

Qualifying
Frederik Vesti took his maiden Formula 2 pole position and the first one for ART Grand Prix this season ahead of Jüri Vips and Silverstone feature race winner Logan Sargeant.

Notes:
 – Amaury Cordeel originally qualified fourth for the Sprint Race, but was given a three-place grid penalty for causing a collision with Olli Caldwell at his latest round's Feature Race in Baku, which resulted in both drivers prematurely ending the race.
 – Roy Nissany originally qualified seventeenth for the Sprint Race, but was given a five-place grid penalty for causing a collision with Dennis Hauger at the previous round's Feature Race in Silverstone, which resulted in both drivers prematurely ending the race.

Sprint race 

Notes:
 – Frederik Vesti, Amaury Cordeel and Olli Caldwell all received a five-second time-penalty for repeatedly exceeding track limits.
 – Liam Lawson was due to start from fourteenth place, but stalled on the grid and was forced to start from pit lane. Thus, his place at the starting grid was left vacant.
 – Ayumu Iwasa received a five-second time-penalty for forcing Logan Sargeant off track.
 – Amaury Cordeel received a thirty-second time-penalty for overtaking under double-yellow flags.

Feature race 

Notes:
 – Roberto Merhi, Ayumu Iwasa and Calan Williams all received a five-second time-penalty for repeatedly exceeding track limits.
 – Liam Lawson and Frederik Vesti received a fifteen-second time-penalty for repeatedly exceeding track limits.
 – Frederik Vesti received a five-second time-penalty for overtaking Olli Caldwell off the track.
 – Richard Verschoor finished first on track, but was disqualified for failing to provide a sufficient fuel sample after the race.
 – Jehan Daruvala received a twenty-second time-penalty after his team attempted to dry the track surface at his grid slot before the race.

Standings after the event 

Drivers' Championship standings

Teams' Championship standings

 Note: Only the top five positions are included for both sets of standings.

See also 
 2022 Austrian Grand Prix
 2022 Spielberg Formula 3 round

References

External links 
 Official website

|- style="text-align:center"
|width="35%"|Previous race:
|width="30%"|FIA Formula 2 Championship2022 season
|width="40%"|Next race:

Spielberg
Spielberg
July 2022 sports events in Austria